The sixth and final season of the HBO drama series The Sopranos began on March 12, 2006, and concluded on June 10, 2007. The season consists of 21 episodes split into two parts; the first 12 episodes began airing on March 12, 2006, and ended on June 4, 2006, and the final 9 episodes began airing on April 8, 2007, with the series finale airing on June 10, 2007. The season was initially meant to consist of twenty episodes, but creator David Chase asked for one more to properly round out the story. The first part was released on DVD in region 1 on November 7, 2006, and on Blu-ray on December 19, 2006. The second part was released on DVD and Blu-ray on October 23, 2007.

The first part of the season focuses on the possibility of redemption as various members of the New Jersey crime family are offered chances to change their behavior, especially mob boss Tony Soprano, who confronts a spiritual awakening following a near-death experience. The second part focuses on the Soprano crime family suffering through the consequences of their actions as they come into conflict with their New York enemies.

Ratings and critical reception were both strong during the sixth season of The Sopranos, but the ending was controversial. The Sopranos won Outstanding Drama Series at the 59th Primetime Emmy Awards for the second part of season six.

Cast and characters

Main cast 
 James Gandolfini as Tony Soprano (21 episodes), the boss of the DiMeo crime family who finds himself undergoing a positive change after a life-threatening incident.
 Lorraine Bracco as Jennifer Melfi (15 episodes), Tony's therapist, who begins to seriously question her longtime relationship with him.
 Edie Falco as Carmela Soprano (21 episodes), Tony's wife.
 Michael Imperioli as Christopher Moltisanti (18 episodes), a capo and Tony's cousin by marriage, whose relationship with him begins to strain.
 Dominic Chianese as Corrado "Junior" Soprano (7 episodes), Tony's uncle, whose deteriorating mental state causes him to do something drastic.
 Steven Van Zandt as Silvio Dante (21 episodes), the family's loyal consigliere.
 Tony Sirico as Paulie "Walnuts" Gualtieri (20 episodes), a short-tempered capo who begins to question his lineage.
 Robert Iler as Anthony "A. J." Soprano Jr. (18 episodes), Tony's son who annoys his parents with his lack of work ethic.
 Jamie-Lynn Sigler as Meadow Soprano (17 episodes), Tony's daughter, who he is trying to prevent from getting anywhere near his occupation.
 Aida Turturro as Janice Soprano (13 episodes), Tony's dramatic sister, who he blames for an unfortunate incident.
 Steven R. Schirripa as Bobby Baccalieri (19 episodes), a kind-hearted capo who Tony takes out his anger towards his wife Janice on.
 Joseph R. Gannascoli as Vito Spatafore (9 episodes), a capo whose standing is put in jeopardy when a secret is exposed.
 Dan Grimaldi as Patsy Parisi (18 episodes), a DiMeo soldier.
 John Ventimiglia as Artie Bucco (7 episodes), Tony's non-mob friend who runs a restaurant, who finds himself feuding with a DiMeo soldier.
 Vincent Curatola as Johnny "Sack" Sacrimoni (6 episodes), the imprisoned boss of the Lupertazzi family that faces several hardships in jail.
 Frank Vincent as Phil Leotardo (19 episodes), the hot-headed underboss of the Lupertazzi family that bumps up against Tony repeatedly.
 Ray Abruzzo as Little Carmine Lupertazzi (8 episodes), a dim-witted associate of the Lupertazzi family that gets involved with Chris.
 Toni Kalem as Angie Bonpensiero (3 episodes), Pussy's widow who gets involved with her husband's old associates.
 Kathrine Narducci as Charmaine Bucco (3 episodes), Artie's moral wife.
 Sharon Angela as Rosalie Aprile (11 episodes), Carmela's best friend.
 Gregory Antonacci as Butch DeConcini (9 episodes), a Lupertazzi capo and friend of Phil's.
 Max Casella as Benny Fazio (11 episodes), a DiMeo soldier.
 Carl Capotorto as Little Paulie Germani (8 episodes), Paulie's nephew.
 Arthur J. Nascarella as Carlo Gervasi (17 episodes), a DiMeo capo.
 Maureen Van Zandt as Gabrielle Dante (10 episodes), Silvio's wife.

Notes

Recurring cast 
 Matt Servitto as Dwight Harris (8 episodes), an FBI counter-terrorism agent who consorts with Tony.
 Cara Buono as Kelli Lombardo Moltisanti (7 episodes), Chris's girlfriend.
 Dania Ramirez as Blanca Selgado (5 episodes), a single mother that A.J. takes an interest in.
 Drea de Matteo as Adriana La Cerva (2 episodes), Chris's former fiancée.

Episodes

Reception

Critical reviews 
On the review aggregator website Metacritic, the sixth season scored 96 out of 100, based on 18 reviews, indicating "Universal acclaim". On Rotten Tomatoes, the first half of the season has an 89% approval rating with an average score of 9.80/10 based on 37 reviews with the following critical consensus: "The Sopranos final season craftily builds to its anticipated climax with more of the dark humor and heartfelt characterizations that made it one of television's strongest series." The second half of the season has an 84% approval rating with an average score of 8.50/10 based on 31 reviews with the following critical consensus: "America's first crime family bows out in a chilling cut to black during a meditative final season that is debatably cruel to audience expectations but wholly committed to its thematic integrity."

In Time Out New York, Andrew Johnston placed The Sopranos at the top of his list of the best TV of 2007, stating: "Even before the final episode aired, the last half-season of David Chase's Garden State gangland saga embodied everything that was great about The Sopranos. Then came the Chase-directed 'Made in America,' which miraculously restored Journey's street cred and created the kind of zeitgeist moment that wasn't supposed to be possible anymore in a fragmented, 600-channel cable universe. Lots of TV dramas are compared to novels these days, but few others (maybe only The Wire) have achieved the scope and substance of literary fiction while painting between the lines of small-screen convention."

 Awards and nominations 58th Primetime Emmy AwardsNomination for Outstanding Drama Series
Nomination for Outstanding Supporting Actor in a Drama Series (Michael Imperioli) (Episodes: "Luxury Lounge" + "The Ride")
Nomination for Outstanding Directing for a Drama Series (David Nutter) (Episode: "Join the Club")
Nomination for Outstanding Directing for a Drama Series (Tim Van Patten) (Episode: "Members Only")Award for Outstanding Writing for a Drama Series (Terrence Winter) (Episode: "Members Only")59th Primetime Emmy AwardsAward for Outstanding Drama SeriesNomination for Outstanding Lead Actor in a Drama Series (James Gandolfini) (Episode: "The Second Coming")
Nomination for Outstanding Lead Actress in a Drama Series (Edie Falco) (Episode: "The Second Coming")
Nomination for Outstanding Supporting Actor in a Drama Series (Michael Imperioli) (Episode: "Walk Like a Man")
Nomination for Outstanding Supporting Actress in a Drama Series (Lorraine Bracco) (Episode: "The Blue Comet")
Nomination for Outstanding Supporting Actress in a Drama Series (Aida Turturro) (Episode: "Soprano Home Movies")
Nomination for Outstanding Guest Actor in a Drama Series (Tim Daly) (Episode: "Walk Like a Man")Award for Outstanding Directing for a Drama Series (Alan Taylor) (Episode: "Kennedy and Heidi")Award for Outstanding Writing for a Drama Series (David Chase) (Episode: "Made in America")Nomination for Outstanding Writing for a Drama Series (David Chase, Matthew Weiner) (Episode: "Kennedy and Heidi")
Nomination for Outstanding Writing for a Drama Series (Terrence Winter) (Episode: "The Second Coming")13th Screen Actors Guild AwardsNomination for Outstanding Performance by a Male Actor in a Drama Series (James Gandolfini)
Nomination for Outstanding Performance by a Female Actor in a Drama Series (Edie Falco)
Nomination for Outstanding Performance by an Ensemble in a Drama Series (Entire Cast)14th Screen Actors Guild AwardsAward for Outstanding Performance by a Male Actor in a Drama Series (James Gandolfini)Award for Outstanding Performance by a Female Actor in a Drama Series (Edie Falco)Award for Outstanding Performance by an Ensemble in a Drama Series (Entire Cast)64th Golden Globe AwardsNomination for Best Actress in a Drama Series (Edie Falco)65th Golden Globe AwardsNomination for Best Actress in a Drama Series (Edie Falco)Writers Guild of America Awards 2006Award for Best Dramatic SeriesWriters Guild of America Awards 2007Nomination for Best Dramatic SeriesAward for Best Dramatic Episode (Terrence Winter) (Episode: "The Second Coming")Directors Guild of America Awards 2006Nomination for Outstanding Directing for a Drama Series (David Nutter) (Episode: "Join the Club")
Nomination for Outstanding Directing for a Drama Series (Tim Van Patten) (Episode: "Members Only")Directors Guild of America Awards 2007Nomination for Outstanding Directing for a Drama Series (David Chase) (Episode: "Made in America")
Nomination for Outstanding Directing for a Drama Series (Tim Van Patten) (Episode: "Soprano Home Movies")22nd TCA AwardsNomination for Program of the Year
Nomination for Outstanding Achievement in Drama
Nomination for Outstanding Individual Achievement in Drama (James Gandolfini)23rd TCA Awards''Award for Outstanding Achievement in Drama'''

References

External links 
 
 

2006 American television seasons
2007 American television seasons
The Sopranos
Split television seasons